Randy is a Swedish punk rock band from Hortlax, Sweden, formed in 1992. They were first inspired by skate punk bands like NOFX and Propagandhi but after the release of The Rest Is Silence and the departure of their bass player Patrik Trydvall, they radically changed their musical style and adopted an older sound reminiscent of Thin Lizzy, The Misfits and Ramones, heavily leaning on a fusion of garage punk and pop to form their new sound. Their first album after the transition in style, You Can't Keep a Good Band Down, earned praise from MaximumRockNRoll, which called it "the best melodic punk CD since Bad Religion's No Control." After his departure, Patrik went on to contribute lead vocals in his now-disbanded punk rock group, Diefenbaker.

While never achieving mainstream success, Randy have developed a cult following in the punk community over the years and were particularly successful in their homeland. They were particularly well-known for writing catchy songs with politically conscious messages, often broaching topics like income inequality, socialism, working-class revolutions throughout European history, and Karl Marx and Marxism. The albums Welfare Problems and The Human Atom Bombs, both released after the band's transition to garage-influenced punk, are especially well regarded by punk fans and music critics.

Randy were signed by Burning Heart Records, a sub-label of Epitaph Records, in the early 2000s. So far, they have released six studio albums. The latest album, Randy the Band, was released in January 2006 on Burning Heart and Fat Wreck Chords.

Recognition and accolades
During the early to mid-2000s, music journalists often compared Randy to similar garage punk and garage rock bands, including fellow Swedish bands The Hives and The (International) Noise Conspiracy. In a review of Randy's fifth album Welfare Problems, Chris O'Toole of the Bedlam Society identified Randy as "being the forefront of popularising the recent garage influenced Rock N' Roll revival." O'Toole also called Randy "one of the overshadowed acts" of that movement considering the relatively higher popularity of their peers.

In 2002, Randy were invited to perform at Club Debaser in Stockholm to honor the memory of the recently-deceased Joe Strummer from The Clash. Other noteworthy bands and artists that performed at the event included Infinite Mass, Weeping Willows, and Dregen and Nicke Borg from Backyard Babies.

In Sweden, Randy were nominated for the prestigious Golden Microphone award in 2004 for Best Live Act; they were nominated for the same by the independent Manifest Awards. They were also nominated for a Swedish Grammy for Best Rock Performance. In addition, their song "X-Ray Eyes," from Welfare Problems, received moderate airplay in Sweden.

In July 2020, the band's song "The Exorcist," featured on You Can't Keep a Good Band Down, was featured on the BBC's flagship film podcast, Kermode & Mayo's Film Review."

Members
 Fredrik Granberg - drums
 Johan Gustafsson - bass, background vocals
 Stefan Granberg - vocals, guitar
 Johan Brändström - guitar, background vocals, some lead vocals

 Former members 
 Patrik Trydvall - vocals, bass (1992–1997)

Releases
Full-length albums
 There's No Way We're Gonna Fit In (Dolores Records 1994)
 The Rest Is Silence (Dolores Records 1996)
 You Can't Keep a Good Band Down (Ampersand Records 1998)
 The Human Atom Bombs (Burning Heart 2001)
 Welfare Problems (Burning Heart 2003)
 Randy the Band (Ny Våg/Burning Heart/Fat Wreck Chords 2005)

EPs, singles and compilations
 "En Riktig Man?" (1992)
 No Carrots for the Rehabilitated EP (1993 Dolores Records)
 Ska EP (1994 Dolores Records)
 "Education for unemployment"  (1995 Dolores Records)
 Refused Loves Randy EP (1995 Startrec, with Refused)
 "At Any Cost" (1996 Dolores Records)
 Out of Nothing comes nothing 7" (1998 Ampersand Records)
 Return of the Read Menace (1999, G7 Welcoming Committee Records)
 "I Don't Need Love" (2001 Burning Heart)
 Cheater EP (2001 Busted Heads Records / G7 Welcoming Committee)
 "The Heebie Jeebies" (2001 Burning Heart)
 "Fat Club" (2001)
 Dropping Food on Their Heads Is Not Enough: Benefit for RAWA (2002 Geykido Comet Records)
 "X-Ray Eyes" (2003 Burning Heart)
 "Beware (If You Don't Want Your Babies To Grow Up To Be Punk Rockers)" (2004 Fat Wreck Chords, with Fat Mike)
 Chemical X DVD'' Music Video Compilation (2008 Geykido Comet Records)

References

External links
 Randy Official Website

Swedish punk rock groups
Fat Wreck Chords artists
G7 Welcoming Committee Records artists
Burning Heart Records artists
English-language singers from Sweden